The Adycha (Adıaççı) is a river in the Republic of Sakha in Russia.

At the end of the Soviet period, a big dam with a hydroelectric station was planned to be built on the river, but following perestroika and economic difficulties in the country the project was given up.

Course 
It heads roughly north and northwest across a wide river valley where taiga and forest tundra predominate, bending around the northern end of the Tirekhtyakh Range. The river is also known as "Borong" (Russian: Боронг) in a section of its upper course. 

River Adycha freezes in October and is under thick ice until the end of May. For about 4½ months it is frozen to the bottom. Part of the river is navigable after the thaw.

Tributaries 
The main tributaries of the Adycha are Delakag (Делакаг), Charky (Чаркы) and Tuostakh (Туостах) on the right; and Derbeke (Дербеке), Nelgese (Нельгесе) and Borulakh (Борулах) on the left.

See also
List of rivers of Russia
Yana Plateau
Yana-Oymyakon Highlands§Hydrography

References

Rivers of the Sakha Republic